Jean-Pierre Rene Capron (August 4, 1921July 2, 1997) was a French painter known for creating muted landscapes with a haunting, lonely feeling, yet with a hint of life in the midst of the emptiness.

Biography

Early life and education
Jean Pierre Capron was born in Cannes, France, August 4, 1921. He studied architecture in Lausanne, Switzerland, then moved to Paris in 1945 where he enrolled at the École des Beaux Arts in the studio of Eugène Narbonne and formed a friendship with Bernard Buffet.

Career
He exhibited for the first time at the Salon d'Automne in 1949 and participated in several important salons and group shows in France and abroad.

In 1950 Jean-Pierre Capron had his first exhibition in Paris in Maurice Garnier, Visconti Gallery. In 1952 he won two major national awards in France, which led to a series of regular exhibitions in Paris galleries. (Gallery Drouant-David, then Drouant Gallery).

In 1961 he had his first exhibition in the USA at the Pomeroy Gallery in San Francisco. he also had a major 1965 exhibit in Chicago and a 1966 exhibit in New York at the Frank Partridge Gallery.
Today his works are found evenly distributed in the U.S. France and Japan.

Death and legacy
Capron died in 1997, leaving a substantial number of landscape paintings and several portraits. His work is in the permanent collections of the Musee d'Art Moderne, the Musee de la Ville de Paris, and the Musee de Poitiers.

Awards and honors
Capron received the Prix Conte-Carriere in 1951. He was a member of the jury of the Salon de la Jeune Peinture from 1951 to 1968.

References

1921 births
1997 deaths
20th-century French painters
20th-century French male artists
French male painters
French landscape painters
People from Cannes